The Office of the United Nations High Commissioner for Human Rights, commonly known as the Office of the High Commissioner for Human Rights (OHCHR) or the United Nations Human Rights Office, is a department of the Secretariat of the United Nations that works to promote and protect human rights that are guaranteed under international law and stipulated in the Universal Declaration of Human Rights of 1948. The office was established by the United Nations General Assembly on 20 December 1993 in the wake of the 1993 World Conference on Human Rights.

The office is headed by the High Commissioner for Human Rights, who co-ordinates human rights activities throughout the United Nations System and acts as the secretariat of the Human Rights Council in Geneva, Switzerland. The eighth and current High Commissioner is Volker Türk of Austria, who succeeded Michelle Bachelet of Chile on 8 September 2022.

In 2018–2019, the department had a budget of $201.6 million (3.7 per cent of the regular United Nations budget), and approximately 1,300 employees based in Geneva and New York City. It is an ex officio member of the Committee of the United Nations Development Group.

Functions and organization

Mandate
The mandate of OHCHR derives from Articles 1, 13 and 55 of the Charter of the United Nations, the Vienna Declaration and Programme of Action and General Assembly resolution 48/141 of 20 December 1993, by which the Assembly established the post of United Nations High Commissioner for Human Rights. In connection with the programme for reform of the United Nations (A/51/950, para. 79), the OHCHR and the Centre for Human Rights were consolidated into a single OHCHR on 15 September 1997.

Purpose
The objectives of OHCHR are to:

 Promote universal enjoyment of all human rights by giving practical effect to the will and resolve of the world community as expressed by the United Nations
 Play the leading role on human rights issues and emphasize the importance of human rights at the international and national levels
 Promote international cooperation for human rights
 Stimulate and coordinate action for human rights throughout the United Nations system
 Promote universal ratification and implementation of international standards
 Assist in the development of new norms
 Support human rights organs and treaty monitoring bodies
 Respond to serious violations of human rights
 Undertake preventive human rights action
 Promote the establishment of national human rights infrastructures
 Undertake human rights field activities and operations
 Provide education, information advisory services and technical assistance in the field of human rights

Organization
The OHCHR is divided into organizational units, as described below. The OHCHR is headed by a High Commissioner with the rank of Under-Secretary-General.

High Commissioner for Human Rights (Under-Secretary-General) 
The United Nations High Commissioner for Human Rights, accountable to the Secretary-General, is responsible for all the activities of the OHCHR, as well as for its administration, and carries out the functions specifically assigned to him or her by the UN General Assembly in its resolution 48/141 of 20 December 1993 and subsequent resolutions of policy-making bodies. It advises the Secretary-General on the policies of the United Nations in the area of human rights, ensures that substantive and administrative support is given to the projects, activities, organs and bodies of the human rights program, represents the Secretary-General at meetings of human rights organs and at other human rights events, and carries out special assignments as decided by the Secretary-General. As well as those human rights that are currently included in legally binding treaties, the High Commissioner also promotes human rights yet to be recognized in international law (such as the adoption of economic, social and cultural rights as a strategic priority, which are not all currently recognized in international legal instruments).

Deputy High Commissioner for Human Rights (Assistant Secretary-General) 
The United Nations High Commissioner for Human Rights, in the performance of his or her activities, is assisted by a Deputy High Commissioner who acts as Officer-in-Charge during the absence of the High Commissioner. In addition, the Deputy High Commissioner carries out specific substantive and administrative assignments as decided by the High Commissioner. The Deputy is accountable to the High Commissioner.

The current Deputy High Commissioner for Human Rights is the Australian national Kate Gilmore.

Assistant Secretary-General for Human Rights (UN Headquarters New York) 
The Assistant Secretary-General for Human Rights (not to be confused with the Deputy High Commissioner, who is also an Assistant Secretary-General) based in New York City heads the New York Office of the High Commissioner. The New York Office represents the High Commissioner at United Nations Headquarters in New York and promotes the integration of human rights in policy processes and activities undertaken by inter-governmental and inter-agency bodies at the United Nations.

The post of Assistant Secretary-General for Human Rights was created in 2010, when Ivan Šimonović was appointed to the position. From 2016 to 2019, the position was held by Andrew Gilmour. The current Assistant Secretary-General for Human Rights, since 2020, is Ilze Brands Kehris.

Staff Office of the United Nations High Commissioner for Human Rights
The Staff Office of the United Nations High Commissioner for Human Rights is headed by a Chief who is accountable to the High Commissioner. The core functions of the Staff Office are to:

 Assist the High Commissioner in the overall direction and supervision of the activities of the human rights program
 Assist the High Commissioner in the formulation, communication, implementation and evaluation of policies, practices and activities for the promotion and protection of human rights
 Assist the High Commissioner in maintaining relations with Governments, other United Nations agencies and entities, international organizations, regional and national institutions, non-governmental organizations, the private sector and academia
 Assist the High Commissioner in maintaining liaison on policy matters with the Executive Office of the Secretary-General and other relevant offices at Headquarters, as well as with the spokespersons of the Secretary-General at New York City and Geneva and the media
 Carry out fund-raising functions and special projects as assigned by the High Commissioner
 Assist the High Commissioner in developing and maintaining a framework for the management and planning of the activities of the human rights program and facilitating the development of the overall work program, and in preparing annual management reports on activities and achievements
 Represent the High Commissioner at meetings and make statements on his or her behalf

Administrative Section
The Administrative Section is headed by a Chief, Kyle F. Ward, who is accountable to the Deputy High Commissioner. The core functions of the Administrative Section, in addition to those set out in section 7 of Secretary-General's bulletin ST/SGB/1997/5, are to:

 Advise the High Commissioner on the budgetary, financial and personnel matters relating to the human rights program
 Assist the High Commissioner and appropriate staff in the discharge of their financial, personnel and general administrative responsibilities and administering the associate expert and internship programs

New York Office
The New York Office is headed by an Assistant Secretary-General who is accountable to the High Commissioner. The core functions of the New York Office are to:

 Represent the High Commissioner at Headquarters, at meetings of policy-making bodies, with permanent missions of Member States, at interdepartmental and inter-agency meetings, with non-governmental organizations and professional groups, at academic conferences and with the media
 Provide policy advice and recommendations on substantive matters to the High Commissioner
 Supply information and advice on human rights to the Executive Office of the Secretary-General
 Provide substantive support on human rights issues to the General Assembly, the Economic and Social Council and other policy-making bodies established in New York City
 Provide materials and information to the permanent missions, United Nations departments, agencies and programs, non-governmental organizations, the media and others regarding the human rights program
 Provide support to the High Commissioner and other officials, and to Special Rapporteurs and Special Representatives when on mission in New York City 
 Undertake other specific assignments as decided by the High Commissioner

Thematic Engagement, Special Procedures and Right to Development Division
The Thematic Engagement, Special Procedures and Right to Development Division is headed by a Director who is accountable to the High Commissioner. The core functions of the Division are to:

 Promote and protect the right to development, in particular by:
 Supporting intergovernmental groups of experts on the preparation of the strategy for the right to development
 Assisting in the analysis of the voluntary reports by States to the High Commissioner on the progress and steps taken for the realization of the right to development and on obstacles encountered
 Carrying out research projects on the right to development and preparing substantive outputs for submission to the General Assembly, the Commission on Human Rights and treaty bodies
 Assisting in the substantive preparation of advisory service projects and educational material on the right to development
 Providing substantive analysis and support to the High Commissioner in his or her mandate to enhance system-wide support for the right to development
 Carry out substantive research projects on the whole range of human rights issues of interest to United Nations human rights bodies in accordance with the priorities established by the Vienna Declaration and Program of Action and resolutions of policy-making bodies
 Support the work of the mandate-holders of the Special Procedures of the Human Rights Council
 Provide substantive services to human rights organs engaged in standard-setting activities
 Prepare documents, reports or draft reports, summaries and synthesis and position papers in response to particular requests, as well as substantive contributions to information materials and publications
 Provide policy analysis, advice and guidance on substantive procedures
 Manage the information services of the human rights programme, including the documentation centre and library, enquiry services and the human rights databases
 Prepare studies on relevant articles of the Charter of the United Nations for the Repertory of Practice of United Nations Organs

Human Rights Council and Treaty Mechanisms Division
The Human Rights Council and Treaty Mechanisms Division is headed by a Director who is accountable to the High Commissioner. The core functions of the Division are to:

 Plan, prepare and service sessions/meetings of the Human Rights Council, the Advisory Committee and related working groups and of the committees established by human rights treaty bodies and their working groups
 Ensure that substantive support is provided in a timely manner to the human rights treaty body concerned, drawing on the appropriate resources of the human rights programme
 Prepare state party reports for review by the treaty body concerned and follow up on decisions and recommendations
 Prepare or coordinate the preparation and submission of all substantive and other documents and the support from other management units to the activities of treaty bodies serviced, and following up on decisions taken at meetings of those bodies
 Plan, prepare and service sessions of board of trustees of the United Nations Voluntary Fund for Victims of Torture, and implement relevant decisions
 Process communications submitted to treaty bodies under optional procedures and communications under the procedures established by the Economic and Social Council in its resolution 1503 (XLVIII) of 27 May 1970 and ensuring follow-up

Field Operations and Technical Cooperation Division
The Field Operations and Technical Cooperation Division is headed by a Director who is accountable to the High Commissioner. The core functions of the Division are to:

 Develop, implement, monitor and evaluate advisory services and technical assistance projects at the request of Governments
 Manage the Voluntary Fund for Technical Cooperation in the Field of Human Rights
 Implement the Plan of Action of the United Nations Decade for Human Rights Education, including the development of information and educational materials;
 Provide substantive and administrative support to human rights fact-finding and investigatory mechanisms, such as special rapporteurs, representatives and experts and working groups mandated by the Commission on Human Rights and/or the Economic and Social Council to deal with specific country situations or phenomena of human rights violations worldwide, as well as the General Assembly's Special Committee to Investigate Israeli Practices Affecting the Human Rights of the Palestinian People and Other Arabs of the Occupied Territories
 Plan, support and evaluate human rights field presences and missions, including the formulation and development of best practice, procedural methodology and models for all human rights activities in the field
 Manage voluntary funds for human rights field presences
 Manage the United Nations Voluntary Fund on Contemporary Forms of Slavery, United Nations Voluntary Fund for Indigenous Populations and United Nations Voluntary Fund for the International Decade of the World's Indigenous People

(Source: OHCHR Website)

High Commissioners for Human Rights

Criticisms
Journalist Emma Reilly leaked e-mails in 2020 and 2021 in which the OHCHR provided names of Chinese participants in UN human rights activities to China on request. This occurred on multiple occasions from before 2012 to at least 2019, despite an explicit ban against this sort of activity. In some cases, after obtaining their name in advance from the UN, the Chinese Communist Party made sure an activist was not able to leave China for Geneva to attend.

See also
 United Nations Commission on Human Rights (replaced by Human Rights Council in 2006)
 United Nations Human Rights Council
 United Nations Guiding Principles on Business and Human Rights

References

Further reading

External links

United Nations Rule of Law: The Office of the High Commissioner for Human Rights, on the rule of law work conducted by the Office of the High Commissioner for Human Rights.

United Nations Development Group
United Nations organizations based in Geneva